The Motatapu River is a river near Wānaka in New Zealand, a tributary of the Mātukituki River.

See also
List of rivers of New Zealand

References

Rivers of Otago
Rivers of New Zealand